PPL Corporation is an energy company headquartered in Allentown, Pennsylvania in the Lehigh Valley region of eastern Pennsylvania. The company is publicly traded on the New York Stock Exchange.

History
Pennsylvania Power & Light was founded in 1920 out of a merger of eight smaller Pennsylvania utilities. It gradually extended its service territory to a crescent-shaped region of central and northeastern Pennsylvania stretching from Lancaster through the Lehigh Valley into Scranton and Wilkes-Barre. In 1995, it reorganized as a holding company, PP&L Resources, which changed its name to its current name, PPL Corporation, in 2000.

The company limited its activities to Pennsylvania until deregulation of electrical utilities in the 1990s encouraged PPL to purchase assets in other states.  The largest of these transactions was PPL's 1998 purchase of 13 plants from Montana Power (leaving NorthWestern Energy – the buyer of the former Montana Power transmission and distribution systems – vulnerable to high "spot" prices on the energy market). This added over 2,500 MW of capacity and was the largest expansion in PPL's history. In 2014, those hydroelectric facilities were sold to NorthWestern.

In 2010, PPL completed the acquisition of two regulated utilities in Kentucky: Louisville Gas and Electric and Kentucky Utilities.

In 2011, PPL completed the acquisition of two regulated regional electricity distribution companies in the United Kingdom. Together, with two previously acquired regional electricity distribution companies, they operate under the name Western Power Distribution (WPD). 

On June 6, 2014, PPL announced it would divest its electrical generation facilities to a newly formed company, Talen Energy.  On June 1, 2015, the Talen spinoff was completed, allowing PPL to concentrate on the transmission and distribution aspects of the electric utility business.

In 2020, PPL initiated a formal process to sell WPD in order to position PPL as a purely U.S.-focused energy company and create additional shareowner value. This resulted in a March 18, 2021, announcement of agreements to sell WPD to National Grid plc for £7.8 billion and acquire National Grid's Rhode Island electric and gas utility, the Narragansett Electric Company, for $3.8 billion. The sale of WPD was completed on June 14, 2021.

The sale of the Narragansett Electric Company was completed on May, 25, 2022, and Narragansett Electric was renamed Rhode Island Energy.

Headquarters

PPL Building

The PPL Building is now the tallest building in not just Allentown, but in the greater Lehigh Valley, after the demolition of the Martin Tower on May 19, 2019. It is located at the intersection of Hamilton and Ninth Streets in the downtown area of the city.

Investments
In a speech before the Edison Electric Institute Financial Conference in November 2019, William Spence, PPL's former chairman and chief executive officer, said that the company is focusing on building more advanced cleaner energy technologies and is also increasing its effort on a strategy known as "Energy Forward." The company has invested billions to improve infrastructure and technology in order to create a smarter, more reliable and resilient energy grid. In the third quarter of 2019, PPL completed a $470 million investment in replacing meters with "advanced" meters in Pennsylvania.

Marketing
In February 2010, PPL Corporation purchased the naming rights to the venue originally known as PPL Park in Chester, Pennsylvania (which is outside of PPL's service territory), the home stadium of Major League Soccer's Philadelphia Union.  As part of the $25 million, 11-year deal, PPL EnergyPlus provides sustainable energy to PPL Park derived from other sources in Pennsylvania. After PPL spun off its non-regulated generation business into the separate Talen Energy, the stadium naming rights were assumed by the spinoff company and the venue became known as Talen Energy Stadium. In February 2020, the park was named Subaru Park.

PPL owns the naming rights to the PPL Center in Allentown, which hosts the Lehigh Valley Phantoms of the American Hockey League starting with the 2014 season. PPL paid an undisclosed sum over ten years.

Customer satisfaction
PPL's companies regularly rank high in customer satisfaction studies. PPL Electric Utilities, which serves 1.4 million customers in 29 counties in Pennsylvania, has received 30 J.D. Power and Associates awards for customer satisfaction.

Louisville Gas and Electric and Kentucky Utilities, which serve 1.3 million customers in almost 100 counties across Kentucky and Virginia, have won 28 J.D. Power awards for customer satisfaction.

Subsidiaries
PPL Electric Utilities Corporation (commonly known as PPL Electric Utilities and formerly known as Pennsylvania Power & Light Company or Pennsylvania Power & Light)
LG&E and KU Energy
Louisville Gas & Electric
Kentucky Utilities
Rhode Island Energy (former territory of Narragansett Electric Company formed in 2022 following purchase from National Grid)
PPL Global

In popular culture
Exterior shots of the PPL Building were used in the 1954 motion picture Executive Suite.

References

External links
PPL Official Web Site

Pennsylvania Power & Light Company records (1883-1941) at Hagley Museum and Library

Electric power companies of the United States
Hydroelectric power companies of the United States
Nuclear power companies of the United States
Natural gas companies of the United States
Energy companies established in 1920
Non-renewable resource companies established in 1920
Companies based in Allentown, Pennsylvania
Infrastructure in Louisville, Kentucky
Companies listed on the New York Stock Exchange